Osmond William Butt (7 February 1934 – 23 February 2002) was a New Zealand professional rugby league footballer who played in the 1950s.

Playing career

International honours
Butt represented New Zealand in 1956 against Australia.

References

External links

Search for "Butt" at rugbyleagueproject.org

1934 births
2002 deaths
New Zealand national rugby league team players
New Zealand rugby league players
Rugby league players from Stratford, New Zealand
Rugby league second-rows
Wellington rugby league team players